The 2005 European Track Championships were the European Championships for track cycling, for junior and under-23 riders. They took place in Fiorenzuola d'Arda, Italy.

Medal summary

Open

Under 23

Juniors

Medal table

References

European Track Championships, 2005
European Track Championships
International cycle races hosted by Italy
Province of Piacenza
2005 in Italian sport